Richard Ellis Uihlein (born 1945) and Elizabeth Uihlein are American billionaire businesspeople, founders of Uline and conservative donors. Richard is also an heir to the Schlitz brewing fortune.

Biographies
Richard graduated from Stanford University with a BA in history in 1967. A member of the Uihlein family, he is a descendant of the brewers of Schlitz beer. His great-grandfather was August Uihlein.

Until 1980, Richard Uihlein worked in international sales for General Binding Corporation, a company co-founded by his father, Edgar Uihlein. That year, with start-up funds from his father, Uihlein and his wife Elizabeth (Liz) Uihlein founded Uline, a shipping supplies company; the couple continue to own the company. The company expanded rapidly and is now one of the largest U.S. privately held companies; in 2014, Forbes estimated a company value of between $700 million and $2 billion.  In 2020 Bloomberg estimated their net worth to be around $4 billion.

As of 2020, the company had around 7,000 employees. Liz Uihlein is the company's president; the couple's four children are all executives at the company. Previously headquartered in Waukegan, Illinois, the company moved to Pleasant Prairie, Wisconsin, in 2010, in return for up to $18.6 million in state incentives. The couple lives in Lake Forest, Illinois; they also have a summer home in Manitowish Waters, Wisconsin.

The Uihlein family also owns EAU Holdings, a resort in northern Wisconsin. Richard Uihlein's cousin is Lynde Bradley Uihlein.

Political activities
Although an influential donor, Richard Uihlein has been described as a person who "shuns the spotlight" and the couple rarely give interviews. Uihlein has been a Republican donor for decades, and increased his political giving after Citizens United v. Federal Election Commission. He has been a longtime donor to Republicans who share his ultra-conservative views.  Uihlein is a staunch social and economic conservative, with views that are anti-union, anti-tax, and pro-deregulation. He has a history of supporting far-right candidates, and has often supported efforts in opposition to gay and transgender rights.

Uihlein spent hundreds of thousands of dollars in the 2011 Wisconsin Senate recall elections, in support of state senators facing recall over their support for legislation to end collective bargaining for public employees, and also backed litigation against public-employee unions, including Janus v. AFSCME. He has supported conservative groups and candidates including Ted Cruz, Roy Moore, The Club for Growth, and the Illinois Policy Institute. Uihlein is also a major donor to Liberty Principles PAC, Americas PAC, and Scott Walker. While Uihlein spent $2.6 million in support of Illinois Governor Bruce Rauner in his successful 2014 Illinois gubernatorial election campaign, Uihlein broke with Rauner after he signed legislation in 2017 that expanded abortion coverage for women on Medicaid,  giving millions to  Jeanne Ives, who challenged Rauner in the 2018 Republican primary.

In the 2014 election cycle, the Uihleins made at least $5 million in political contributions, mostly to right-wing PACs ($1.8 million to Liberty Principles PAC; $670,000 to Americas PAC, and slightly under $500,000 to Jim DeMint's Senate Conservatives Fund and affiliated super PAC).

The Uihleins gave $22 million in the 2016 election cycle. The 2016 Republican primaries, Uihlein initially supported Walker and Ted Cruz; after they both dropped out of the race, Uihlein backed Donald Trump, contributing money to the pro-Trump "Great America PAC" and contributing $500,000 to Trump's inauguration, which he attended. He also donated hundreds of thousands of dollars to the Republican National Committee. Liz Uihlein also subsequently became a "mega-donor" to Trump.

From 2016 to 2018, a political action committee funded by the Uihleins gave at least $646,000 to a new network of free newspapers and websites, created by Brian Timpone, that mimic local newspapers but offer pay-for-play articles to conservative clients. ProPublica reported that the Uihleins were 1 of 82 households that benefitted from a concession won by Wisconsin senator Ron Johnson, to whom they had been large donors.

In the 2018 election cycle, Uihlein dramatically increased his political contributions, making $37.7 million in contributions to outside spending groups (the fourth largest donor to such groups). The couple's contributions placed them on the tier of other Republican mega-donors, such as the Koch family, Adelson, and Mercer. His contributions include support for many Republican candidates in competitive primary races, such as Ives and Chris McDaniel. Also in 2018, Uihlein gave financial support to Kevin Nicholson, a one time long-shot Republican candidate for U.S. Senate in Wisconsin; eight super PACs funded by Uihlein also expressed support for Nicholson. In 2019–2020, Uihlein gave $250,000 to Allen West in his campaign for the chairmanship of the Texas Republican Party against incumbent James Dickey.

In the 2020 election cycle, the Uihleins and their company had, by April 2020, contributed $1.5 million to Trump's "America First Action" super PAC, and $20 million to other Republican groups. From 2015 to 2020, they donated $4.3 million (including $800,000 in October 2020) to Tea Party Patriots, a group that may have co-sponsored the March to Save America rally that preceded the 2021 United States Capitol attack.

Uihlein was a major financial backer for the rally that preceded the January 6 attack on the Capitol. Uihlein is also the "largest donor behind Women Speak Out a [PAC] seeking to federally outlaw abortion." Uihlein has also donated millions to Restoration PAC, which promotes "all marriage is for one man and one woman for life."

In columns in the company catalog, Liz Uihlein frequently writes on the couple's political views, ranging from "the danger of Chinese competition, the negative health effects of marijuana use and the detriments of the Federal Reserve's low interest rate policy." As of June 10, 2022, Richard Uihlein has contributed $28,095,000 to People Who Play By The Rules PAC.

COVID-19
During the COVID-19 pandemic in the United States, Liz Uihlein declared the pandemic "overhyped" and was an outspoken critic of stay-at-home directives issued to combat the spread of the virus, calling upon Republican members of the Wisconsin Legislature to push to remove Governor Tony Evers from office over the directive he issued.

In November 2020, the couple announced to the company that they had contracted COVID.

References

External links
 "Manitowish Waters' main benefactors get mixed reviews" - Milwaukee Journal-Sentinel
 "The Most Powerful Conservative Couple You’ve Never Heard Of" - The New York Times
 "Uihlein box of tricks" - Politico
 "House divided: The megadonor couple battling in the GOP's civil war" - Politico

1945 births
Living people
Illinois Republicans
American billionaires
20th-century American businesspeople
Stanford University alumni
People from Lake Forest, Illinois
21st-century American businesspeople
Businesspeople from Illinois
Female billionaires
Conservatism in the United States
20th-century American businesswomen
21st-century American businesswomen
Uihlein Family